Korala or Kora La or Koro La (literally Kora Pass) is a mountain pass between Tibet and Upper Mustang. At only  in elevation, it has been considered the lowest drivable path between Tibetan Plateau and the Indian subcontinent. It is currently being planned as a vehicle border crossing between China and Nepal.

Geography

Korala is situated on the drainage divide between the Yarlung Tsangpo and Ganges river basins.  At , it is the lowest pass across the Himalayan mountain range.  As such, it forms the key col for K2 on the ridgeline connecting it to Mount Everest. The Kali Gandaki River has its source near the southern side of the pass.

History

Korala is one of the oldest routes between the two regions. It was historically used for salt trade between Tibet and Nepalese kingdoms. Up until 2008 when Nepali monarchy was abolished, Upper Mustang was the Kingdom of Lo, an ethnic Tibetan kingdom that was a suzerainty of Kingdom of Nepal. The suzerainty allowed for a certain level of independence in local governance from the Nepalese central government.

During the late 1950s and 60s, the Tibetan guerrilla group Chushi Gangdruk operated out of Upper Mustang with the intention of raiding PLA positions in Tibet. This led to a border incident that caused the killing of a Nepalese officer who was mistaken by Chinese border guards as a Tibetan rebel.

People's Republic of China and Kingdom of Nepal officially signed border agreement in 1961. The border was set slightly north of the traditional boundary marker.

In late December 1999, the 17th claimant Karmapa Ogyen Trinley Dorje fled Tibet through this area. In response, China built a border fence immediately after. There is a PLA border outpost named "Kunmuja" a few miles on Chinese side, it is the westernmost border outpost in Tibet Military District. The outpost was renovated in 2009 to have a modern facility.

The border has been closed since the 1960s. However, there is a semiannual cross-border trade fair during which the border is open to local traders. In 2012, Nepal and China agreed to open 6 more official border crossings, Korala being one of them. In July 2016, Nepalese government announced that this border crossing is expected to open, and also expects it to be the third most important crossing between the two countries. , the border infrastructure on the Chinese side has been completed, Nepali authority is in the process of upgrading the road network.

References

Mountain passes of Tibet
Mountain passes of China
Mustang District
Shigatse
China–Nepal border crossings
Mountain passes of the Himalayas
Zhongba County